The Tamale Teaching Hospital is a Teaching hospital in Tamale in the Northern region and the third largest hospital in Ghana. It serves as a referral hospital for the five northern regions of Ghana. The main hospital in Northern Ghana, 2 km southeast of town. It cooperates with the University for Development Studies in Northern Ghana to offer undergraduate and graduate programs in medicine, nursing and nutrition. It is the third teaching hospital in Ghana after the Korle Bu Teaching Hospital and the Komfo Anokye Teaching Hospital.

History
The hospital was established in 1974 and was formerly known as the Tamale Regional Hospital. It was to provide various health care services to the people of the three Northern regions of Ghana namely, the Northern, Upper East and Upper West regions.

Teaching hospital status
In 2005 the Northern Regional Coordinating Council decided to partner the Ghana Health Service to upgrade the hospital to the status of a Teaching Hospital. The upgrade made the hospital the third teaching hospital in the country. The upgrade was to help with the training of health professionals from the University of Development Studies.

Mandate
The mandate of the hospital is set by Act 525 of the Ghana Health Service and Teaching Hospitals Act of 1996. The stipulations of the mandate empowers the hospital to function in three critical areas namely, the provision of advanced clinical health services, supporting the training of undergraduates and postgraduates in medical sciences and finally, undertaking research into health issues for the purpose of improving health care.

Infrastructural Development
The hospital in 2012 had a donation of 335,000 Ghana cedis for the construction of an ultra modern Neonatal Intensive Care Unit (NICU). The donation from MTN Ghana was in response to a need identified by Lord Paul Boateng and his wife when the visited the hospital in 2011. The completed units as of July 2015 have facilities to serve forty neonates and their mothers. It also contains office spaces as well as students' learning areas. The hospital secured a dedicated power cable from Akosombo to supply them with uninterpreted electricity.

Governing Board 
An 11-member governing body for the Tamale Teaching Hospital was inaugurated on 28 February 2019.

The members of the board include Mr. Mahmoud Hamid (Chairman), Dr. David Zawumya Kolbilla, Prof. Francis A. Abantanga, Mr. George A. Atampugre, Dr. Abass Adam, Mrs. Dangnikuu Evelyn-Eda. Others are Mr. Kuuri Karim, Pham. Hamid Abdulai, Nana Agyei Mensah, Justice Eric Baah and Clara Tia Sulemana.

References

Hospital buildings completed in 1974
Hospitals established in 1974
Hospitals in Ghana
Tamale, Ghana
Medical education in Ghana
Teaching hospitals